Santa Rosa is a Barcelona Metro station in Santa Coloma de Gramenet, a suburb of Barcelona (Catalonia, Spain). It's served by L9 (orange line). The station opened in September 2011 in a previously built line section between Fondo and Can Peixauet. Its only entrance is in Avinguda dels Banús at the intersection with Carrer d'Irlanda. Its platforms are 108 metres long and located 44 m. under the street level. The area around the station underwent a refurbishment including a new square.

Services

See also
 List of Barcelona Metro stations

References

External links
 La Vanguardia
 Europa Press

Transport in Santa Coloma de Gramenet
Railway stations in Spain opened in 2011
Barcelona Metro line 9 stations